is a former Japanese football player.

Playing career
Kazuki Kotera played for Sagawa Printing, Okinawa Kariyushi FC and FC Ryukyu from 2006 to 2014.

References

External links

1983 births
Living people
Kindai University alumni
Association football people from Shiga Prefecture
Japanese footballers
J3 League players
Japan Football League players
SP Kyoto FC players
FC Ryukyu players
Association football midfielders